Jane Silverthorne (July 26, 1953 – August 15, 2022) was a biologist based in America who worked on plant development in response to light. She became a program officer at the National Science Foundation in the USA as well as a Senior Policy Analyst for the White House Office on Science and Technology.

Early life and education
Silverthorne was born in England. Her father, William Silverthorne, was in the navy so the family that included her mother Margaret and sister moved between England, Scotland and Malta during her childhood. She developed an interest in plants at her secondary school, Farnham Girls' Grammar School in Surrey. She gained her B.Sc. degree in biology from the University of Sussex followed by her doctorate in 1980 at University of Warwick working on chloroplasts under the supervision of R. John Ellis FRS. She then undertook post-doctoral research at the University of California Los Angeles in the 1980s with Elaine M. Tobin and her research developed to focus on the phytochrome light detecting pigments. They demonstrated that some phytochromes controlled the transcription of some genes involved in photosynthesis.

Career
Silverthorne was a member of faculty at the University of California Santa Cruz from 1987 until 2004, attaining a full professorship. In 2002 her laboratory at UC Santa Cruz was one of several destroyed in a fire.

She was a permanent program officer at the National Science Foundation for two decades from 2004 after taking a temporary post there in 1999, keeping up with the rapid changes to plant science in the early twenty-first century. She was responsible for managing the Plant Genome Program and also developed policies to support young researchers and collaborative projects in developing countries. This included initiating the Basic Research to Enable Agricultural Development (BREAD) program in collaboration with the Bill & Melinda Gates Foundation. From November 2006 to March 2008 she was a senior policy analyst in the life sciences in the White House Office of Science and Technology Policy. in 2014 she became the deputy assistant director for the Biological Sciences Directorate at the NSF.
She retired in 2017, and died in Arlington, Virginia on August 15, 2022.

Publications
Silverthorne's over 25 scientific publications include:
 Christensen, Steen; Silverthorne, Jane (2001) Origins of phytochrome-modulated Lhcb mRNA expression in seed plants Plant Physiology 126 (4) 1609–1618
 Peer, W; Silverthorne, J; Peters  J.L. (1996)  Developmental and light-regulated expression of individual members of the light-harvesting complex b gene family in Pinus palustris Plant Physiology 111 (2) 627–634

Awards
In 2012 she was elected a fellow of the American Association for the Advancement of Science. In 2020 she was given the Leadership in Science Public Service Award by the American Society of Plant Biologists.

References

1953 births
2022 deaths
Alumni of the University of Sussex
Alumni of the University of Warwick
University of California, Santa Cruz faculty
Botanists
Molecular biologists
Fellows of the American Association for the Advancement of Science
Office of Science and Technology Policy officials
American academic administrators